Great Neck is a station on the Long Island Rail Road's Port Washington Branch in Great Neck Plaza, New York. It is the westernmost station on the branch in Nassau County. From just east of the station, the line becomes single track to Port Washington.

History
Great Neck was originally the terminus of the New York and Flushing Railroad when it was built in 1866 by a subsidiary called the North Shore Railroad, and called Brookdale Station. The NY&F was acquired by the Flushing and North Side Railroad in 1869, and the name was changed to Great Neck in 1872. The F&NS was consolidated into the Flushing, North Shore and Central Railroad in 1874 through a merger with the Central Railroad of Long Island, only to be leased in 1876 by the LIRR.

Though Great Neck station served as a terminal station for much of the 19th Century, it was never intended to stay this way. An attempt to extend the line east from the station toward Roslyn failed in 1882. Thirteen years later, wealthy Port Washington residents persuaded the LIRR to bring the terminus to their hometown. This required the construction of the Manhasset Viaduct over the marshes at the southern end of Manhasset Bay, which was authorized by an LIRR subsidiary called the Great Neck and Port Washington Railroad. On June 23, 1898, the first LIRR train passed through Great Neck to cross the Manhasset Viaduct, Long Island's highest railroad bridge to extend the line through Manhasset, Plandome and Port Washington. In 1924, the station was closed and moved to its current location on February 26, 1925, as a grade crossing elimination project brought the tracks below ground by June 8, 1934. Elevators are on both sides. The wall along the southeastern platform has an aluminum sculpture by artist David Saunders that was installed in 2001.

The station recently received enhancements and modernizations, including Wi-Fi, new bike racks, and charging stations amongst other things, as part of a greater, systemwide initiative to upgrade stations and infrastructure.

Station layout
The station has two high-level side platforms, each 10 cars long.

Pocket track
Track 2 extends approximately one-train length beyond the station before merging with Track 1. This will allow the LIRR to increase the number of peak-hour trips between Great Neck and Penn Station/Grand Central. It also included replacement of the original Colonial Road Bridge, built in 1897, which passes over the area of the expanded pocket track, with a new bridge with wider lanes and built to reduce noise. Also included in the project are drainage improvements to the right of way to alleviate flooding on the tracks during storms. In 2010, several homeowners in the area opposed the project, arguing that construction would harm their quality of life. Representatives from the MTA stated that the expanded pocket track would not be used for overnight train storage or maintenance. The project was initially scheduled for completion in December 2015. Because of delays, the new bridge was installed in April 2016, and the construction of the pocket track was scheduled for completion in December 2018 at a total cost of $45.2 million.

In popular culture 
The Great Neck station was referenced in The Great Gatsby as "West Egg".

Gallery

References

External links

Manhasset Viaduct Photos (Forgotten-NY.com)
Manhasset Viaduct from Shore Road and Close-Up
 Entrance from Google Maps Street View
Platforms from Google Maps Street View
Waiting Room (Interior) from Google Maps Street View

Long Island Rail Road stations in Nassau County, New York
Railway stations in the United States opened in 1866
Railway stations in the United States opened in 1924
Great Neck Peninsula
1866 establishments in New York (state)